Carsten "Calle" Fischer (born 29 August 1961) is a former field hockey player from West Germany, who competed at four Summer Olympics for his native country. He won the golden medal with his team at the 1992 Summer Olympics in Barcelona, after securing silver at the two previous Olympics in Los Angeles (1984) and Seoul (1988).
At his fourth Olympic games, in Atlanta (1996), he came fourth.
Fischer was nicknamed The Man with The Hammer for his ferocious penalty corners. He played 259 international matches for Germany, scored a total number of 154 goals and played club hockey at HTC Uhlenhorst Mülheim in Mülheim an der Ruhr. He was born in Duisburg. In 1990 he was diagnosed with diabetes and lost all his hair. He finished his international sports career in 1996, and his national career the next year.

External links
 
 
 

1961 births
Living people
German male field hockey players
Olympic field hockey players of West Germany
Field hockey players at the 1984 Summer Olympics
Field hockey players at the 1988 Summer Olympics
Field hockey players at the 1992 Summer Olympics
Field hockey players at the 1996 Summer Olympics
Sportspeople from Duisburg
Olympic medalists in field hockey
Medalists at the 1992 Summer Olympics
Medalists at the 1988 Summer Olympics
Medalists at the 1984 Summer Olympics
Olympic gold medalists for West Germany
Olympic silver medalists for West Germany
People with type 1 diabetes
1990 Men's Hockey World Cup players